RCTV International (formerly known as Coral Pictures or Coral International) is a subsidiary of Empresas 1BC. It was formed in Miami, Florida in 1982 as Coral Pictures to be the international distributor of RCTV's productions.

In 1986, the company had bought out the assets of Ziv International from Lorimar-Telepictures for an undisclosed price, in exchange, L-T received a minority 20% stake in the two Puerto Rico stations owned by RCTV.

RCTV moved to cable in 2007 after the Venezuelan government of Hugo Chavez refused to renew its terrestrial license. In 2010, Venezuelan President Hugo Chavez had taken six cable television channels off the air, including RCTV International, for breaking a law on transmitting government material. The government had urged cable services to drop channels ignoring the rules.

References

External links
 

Companies based in Miami
Television channels and stations established in 1982
1982 establishments in Florida
Empresas 1BC subsidiaries
International